The 1951–52 season was Blackpool F.C.'s 44th season (41st consecutive) in the Football League. They competed in the 22-team Division One, then the top tier of English football, finishing ninth. Stan Mortensen was the club's top scorer for the eighth consecutive season, with 26 goals in all competitions.

Table

Notes

References

Blackpool F.C.
Blackpool F.C. seasons